Samuel Mack Meeks was an American professional baseball player.

Mostly a shortstop during his Major League career, Meeks debuted with the 1948 Washington Senators, but played the bulk of his MLB games with the Cincinnati Reds, including the full seasons of –.  He also had his most memorable day as a big leaguer as a Red, after his recall late in the  season. On September 22 at Crosley Field he started a doubleheader at second base against the New York Giants. Meeks collected four hits in seven at bats, including a double and two home runs, with three runs batted in. Two days later, he started another game at home, this time against the Pittsburgh Pirates, and collected two more hits and two more RBI.  The three-day skein raised Meeks' batting average from .238 to .344, and he eventually batted .306 during his September trial.

Meeks made the 1950 Reds and appeared in a career-high 39 games, with 95 at-bats.  He posted another strong year at the plate, hitting .284 with five multi-hit games. But his playing time decreased significantly in 1951, when he registered only 35 at-bats (mostly as a pinch hitter) and hit only .229. He then spent the rest of his career in the minors, mostly in the Double-A Southern Association.

References

External links

Cincinnati Reds players
Washington Senators (1901–1960) players